Salibacterium halochares is a Gram-positive, aerobic and halophilic bacterium from the genus of Salibacterium which has been isolated from a saltern from Mesolongi in Greece.

References

 

Bacillaceae
Bacteria described in 2010